Flavio Jesús Santos Carrillo (born 1 March 1987) is a Mexican professional footballer who plays as a winger.

Santos began his playing career in the Atlas youth teams in 2006. He managed to break into the first team on February 2, 2008, during the 1–0 loss to Pachuca. He is also the only Mexican player to score two goals in the same match against an Argentine team during the Toluca victory (3-2) over Boca Juniors.

External links
 
 

1987 births
Living people
Mexican footballers
Mexico under-20 international footballers
Liga MX players
Atlas F.C. footballers
Deportivo Toluca F.C. players
Club Puebla players
Alebrijes de Oaxaca players
Association football midfielders
Footballers from Guadalajara, Jalisco